Programmer's Day, also known as the Day of the Programmer, is a professional day that is celebrated in Russian Federation on the 256th (hexadecimal 100th, or the 28th) day of each year (September 13 during common years and on September 12 in leap years).

The number 256 (28) was chosen because it is the number of distinct values that can be represented with a byte, a value well known to programmers. 256 is also the highest power of two that is less than 365, the number of days in a common year.

Official recognition
This particular day was proposed by Valentin Balt and Michael Cherviakov (aka htonus), employees of Parallel Technologies (a software company). As early as 2002, they tried to gather signatures for a petition to the government of Russia to recognize the day as the official Day of the Programmer.

On July 24, 2009, the Ministry of Communications and Mass Media (Russia) issued a draft of an executive order on a new professional holiday, Day of the Programmer.

On September 11, 2009, President of Russia Dmitry Medvedev signed the decree.

Criticism
Due to Russian invasion of Ukraine, members of the Ukrainian IT community have proposed to boycott this holiday.

Chinese Programmer's Day

In China, the programmer's day is October 24, which has been established for many years. The date was chosen because it can also be written as 1024, which is equal to 210 and corresponds to the Ki binary prefix.  It is also a consistent date regardless of leap years.

See also

World Information Society Day
System Administrator Appreciation Day
Secretary's Day

References

Sources

Observances in Russia
September observances
Autumn events in Russia
Computing culture